Hasanabad (also Romanized as Ḩasanābād) is a village in Jargalan Rural District, Raz and Jargalan District, Bojnord County, North Khorasan Province, Iran. At the 2006 census, its population was 290, in 66 families.

References 

Populated places in Bojnord County